Palma Nova Beach is seven kilometers (4.3 mi) from Calvià, situated between Punta Nadala and es Carregador, on the Spanish Balearic island of Majorca. Besides Palmanova beach, other names by which the beach is known include "Playa de Palma Nova", and "Platja de Palma Nova". The Palma Nova sea front has three beaches: Torrenova, Es Carregador, and Palma Nova.

History
Development started in 1935, at which time the name Són Caliu pel de Palma Nova was replaced. Initial tourist urbanization took place on the grounds of finca de Ses Planes. The Spanish Civil War and the isolation of the country, until the late 1950s, interrupted the process. The first hotels were l'Hotel Platja (1957) and l'Hotel Morocco (1959).

Aerial photos and maps

References

Bibliography

External links
Mallorcafact.com
Shagalluf.com
Worldtravelguide.net
Mallorca-beaches.com

Beaches of Mallorca
Tourist attractions in Mallorca
Beaches of the Balearic Islands